Khajehlar may refer to:
Khujehlar, Kalaleh
Khvajehlar